Upper Chitral District is a district of the Pakistani province of Khyber Pakhtunkhwa situated on the Chitral River. Upper Chitral District along with Chitral lower district were part of the erstwhile Chitral District was the largest district in the Khyber-Pakhtunkhwa province of Pakistan, covering an area of 14,850 km2 and likewise served as the Chitral princely state that encompassed the region until its direct incorporation into Khyber Pakhtunkhwa province in Pakistan in 1969. Upper Chitral District and Lower Chitral District was bifurcated from erstwhile Chitral District in November 2018.

The town Buni is the capital of Chitral Upper district. It shares a border with Gilgit-Baltistan to the east, with Badakshan province of Afghanistan to the north and west, and with the Khyber-Pakhtunkhwa districts of Upper Dir and Swat to the south. A narrow strip of Wakhan Corridor separates Chitral from Tajikistan in the north.

Demographics 
At the time of the 2017 census the district had a population of 169,297 of which 81,993 were males and 87,297 females. The population was entirely rural. The literacy rate was 67.31% - the male literacy rate was 80.50% while the female literacy rate was 55.31%. 16 people were from religious minorities.

99.09% of the population spoke languages recorded as 'Other' on the census. The main language is Khowar, sometimes called Chitrali, spoken by the Dardi Kho. Wakhi is spoken in the northern regions along the Afghan border.

Administrative Divisions
 Buni Tehsil
 Mastuj Tehsil
 Torkhow/Mulkhow Tehsil

National Assembly 
The district along with Lower Chitral District is represented by one elected MNA (Member of National Assembly) in Pakistan National Assembly. Its constituency is NA-1.

Provincial Assembly 
The district along with Lower Chitral District is represented by one elected MPA in the provincial assembly who represent the following constituencies:PK-1

References 

Districts of Khyber Pakhtunkhwa
Upper Chitral District